Douglas Miller Reid  (1897–1959) was a 20th-century Scottish schoolmaster and noted amateur botanist and botanical author.

Life
He was born in Motherwell on 25 November 1897 and educated at Motherwell Academy.

In 1918, aged only 21, he became a Member of the Linnean Society of London, later being elected a Fellow (FLS). From 1921 until 1953 he was Biology Master of Harrow School. He was also Curator of the Butler Museum.

In 1942 he was elected a Fellow of the Royal Society of Edinburgh. His proposers were Edward Hindle, Alexander Condie Stephen, Edward Wyllie Fenton and John Berry.

He died suddenly on 4 September 1959 at his home, House of Stoer near Lairg in Sutherland in northern Scotland.

Publications
Animal Classification and Distribution (1925)
Introduction to Biology
Botany for the Gardener (1966)

References

1897 births
1959 deaths
People from Motherwell
Fellows of the Royal Society of Edinburgh
20th-century British botanists
Fellows of the Linnean Society of London
Teachers at Harrow School